This is the order of battle for the World War II Battle of Midway, which took place 4–7 June 1942.

Overview
Ships involved in the Midway operation
{| class="wikitable"
|-
! Imperial Japanese Navy
! Ship Type
! United States Navy
|-
|  |  |  |  
| CV
|  |  |   
|-
|  | 
| CVL
| None
|-
|   |  |  | 
| CVS/AVD
|  | 
|-
|  |  |  |  |  |  |  |  |  |  | 
| BB
| None
|-
|  |  |  |   |  |  |  |   |  |  | 
| CA
|  |  |  |  |  |  | 
|-
|  |  |  |  |  |  
| CL
| 
|-
|  |  |  |  |  |  |  |  |  |  |  |  |  |  |  |  |  |  |  |  |  |  |  |  |  |  |  |  |  |  |  |  |  |  |  |  |  |  |  |  |  |  |  |  |  | 
| DD
|  |  |  |  |  |  |  |  |  |  |  |  |  |  |  |  |  |  |  | 
|-
|  |  |  |  |  |  |  |  |  |  |  |  |  |  |  |  |  |  |  |  |  |  
| Submarine
|  |  |  |  |  |  |  |  |  |  |  |  |  |  |    |  |  |  | 
|-
|  |  |  |  |  |  |  |  |  |  |  | Toa Maru |  |  | 
| AO
|  |  |  |  
|-
||No. 1 | No. 2 | No. 34 | No. 35
| PT
|  |  |  |  |  |  |  |  |  |  |  | Crystal | YP-284 | YP-290 | YP-345 | YP-350
|-
||Asaka Maru | Awata Maru
| AMC
| None
|-
|-
||Soya
| AE
| None
|-
|| Argentina Maru | Azuma Maru | Brazil Maru | Goshu Maru | Hakusan Maru | Hokuroku Maru | Kano Maru | Keiyo Maru | Kinugasa Maru | Kirishima Maru | Kiyosumi Maru | Kumagawa Maru | Meiyo Maru |  Nankai Maru | Toa Maru No. 2 Go | Tōkō Maru No. 2 Go | Yamafuku Maru | Zenyo Maru
| AP / AK
| None
|-
||Tama Maru No. 3 | Tama Maru No. 5 | Showa Maru No. 7 | Showa Maru No. 8 | Hakuhō Maru | Kaihō Maru | Shunkotsu Maru
| AMS
| None
|-
||CH-16 | CH-17 | CH-18| SC
| None
|-
| 
| AR
| None
|-
| Magane Maru| ML
||None
|-
||None
| AT
| 
|-
| 105 x Mitsubishi A6M "Zero" | 97 x Aichi D3A "Val" | 101 x Nakajima B5N "Kate"
| A/C
| 88 x Grumman F4F-4 "Wildcat" | 129 x Douglas SBD-3 "Dauntless" | 44 x Douglas TBD-1 "Devastator" | 32 x Consolidated PBY Catalina | 6 x Grumman TBF "Avenger" | 4 x Martin B-26 "Marauder" | 19 x Boeing B-17 "Flying Fortress"
|-
|}

Japan
The Japanese forces (the "Combined Fleet") actually consisted of two different fleets detailed to two separate operations, namely Operation AL (for the Aleutians) and Operation MI (for Midway). The list below shows all ships assigned to Operation MI, but only Nagumo's First Carrier Striking Force and Kurita's Midway Support Force were actually involved in the Battle of Midway.

First Fleet
First Fleet Main Force
1st Battleship Division (Admiral Isoroku Yamamoto, commander of the Japanese Combined Fleet in Yamato):
  (Rear Admiral Gihachi Takayanagi)
2 s:
 (Rear Adm. Gunji Kogure)
 (Captain Hideo Yano)
Carrier Group:
CVE  (Capt. Kaoru Umetani)
Air Unit: 8 Yokosuka B4Y1 'Jean' biplane torpedo bombers (Lieutenant Yoshiaki Irikiin)
  (Lt. Cmdr. Shizuka Kajimoto)
Special Force:
CVS  (Capt. Kaku Harada)
CVS  (Capt. Katsumi Komazawa)
Screening Force
3rd Destroyer Squadron (Rear Adm. Shintaro Hashimoto in Sendai):
CL  (Capt. Nobue Morishita)
11th Destroyer Division (Capt. Kichiro Shoji): 
4 s:
 (Lt. Cmdr. Shizuo Yamashita)
 (Lt. Cmdr. Rokoro Sugawara)
 (Lt. Cmdr. Junnari Kamiura)
 (Lt. Cmdr. Hideo Higashi)
19th Destroyer Division (Capt. Ranji Oe): 
4 s:
 (Cmdr. Ryokichi Sugama)
 (Lt. Cmdr. Tsutomu Hagio)
 (Lt. Cmdr. Akifumi Kawahashi)
 (Cmdr. Eiji Sakuma)
1st Supply Group (Capt. Shigeyasu Nishioka in Naruto):
AO Naruto (Capt. Nishioka)
AO Toei MaruFirst Carrier Striking Force / First Air Fleet (Vice Admiral Chuichi Nagumo)
1st Carrier Division (Vice Adm. Nagumo in Akagi):
 (sunk/scuttled) (Capt. Taijiro Aoki)
Air Unit (Commander Mitsuo Fuchida): 
18 Mitsubishi A6M2 Type 21 'Zeke' fighters (Lt. Cmdr. Shigeru Itaya)
18 Aichi D3A1 'Val' dive bombers (Lt. Takehiko Chihaya)
18 Nakajima B5N2 'Kate' torpedo bombers (Lt. Cmdr. Shigeharu Murata)
 (sunk/scuttled) (Capt. Jisaku Okada†)
Air Unit (Lt. Cmdr. Tadashi Kusumi†): 
18 Mitsubishi A6M2 Type 21 'Zeke' fighters (Lt. Masao Sato)
18 Aichi D3A1 'Val' dive bombers (Lt. Shoichi Ogawa†)
27 Nakajima B5N2 'Kate' torpedo bombers (Lt. Ichiro Kitajima)
2nd Carrier Division (Rear Adm. Tamon Yamaguchi† in Hiryū)
 (sunk/scuttled) (Capt. Tomeo Kaku†)
Air Unit (Lt. Joichi Tomonaga†): 
18 Mitsubishi A6M2 Type 21 'Zeke' fighters (Lt. Shigeru Mori†)
18 Aichi D3A1 'Val' dive bombers (Lt. Michio Kobayashi†)
18 Nakajima B5N2 'Kate' torpedo bombers (Lt. Rokuro Kikuchi†)
 (sunk/scuttled) (Capt. Ryusaku Yanagimoto†)
Air Unit (Lt. Cmdr. Takashige Egusa): 
18 Mitsubishi A6M2 Type 21 'Zeke' fighters (Lt. Masaji Suganami)
16 Aichi D3A1 'Val' dive bombers (Lt. Masai Ikeda)
18 Nakajima B5N2 'Kate' torpedo bombers (Lt. Heijiro Abe)
2 Yokosuka D4Y1 'Judy' dive bombers
Support Group
8th Cruiser Division (Rear Adm. Hiroaki Abe in Tone):
2  heavy cruisers:
 (Capt. Tametsugu Okada)
Air Unit: 3 Aichi E13A1 Type 0 'Jake' float planes, 2 Nakajima E8N2 Type 95 'Dave' float planes
 (Capt. Keizo Komura)
Air Unit: 3 Aichi E13A1 Type 0 'Jake' float planes, 2 Nakajima E8N2 Type 95 'Dave' float planes
3rd Battleship Division, 2nd Section (Rear Adm. Tamotsu Takama in Haruna):
2  fast battleships:
 (Rear Adm. Takama) – 3 Nakajima E8N2 Type 95 'Dave' float planes
 (Capt. Sanji Iwabuchi) – 3 Nakajima E8N2 Type 95 'Dave' float planes
Screening Force
10th Destroyer Squadron (Rear Adm. Susumu Kimura in Nagara):
CL  (Capt. Toshio Naoi)
4th Destroyer Division (Capt. Kōsaku Aruga):
4 s:
 (Cmdr. Magataro Koga)
 (Cmdr. Yusumasa Watanabe)
 (Cmdr. Juichi Iwagami)
 (Cmdr. Seiji Nakasugi)
10th Destroyer Division (Capt. Toshio Abe):
3 s:
 (Cmdr. Masayoshi Yoshida)
 (Cmdr. Shigeo Semba)
 (Cmdr. Isamu Fujita)
17th Destroyer Division (Capt. Masayuki Kitamura): 
4 s:
 (Cmdr. Nagayoshi Shiraishi)
 (Cmdr. Shunichi Toyoshima)
 (Cmdr. Motoi Katsumi)
 (Cmdr. Tsuneo Orita)
Supply Group 1 (Capt. Masanao Ota in Kyokuto Maru):
  (Cmdr. Shohei Soma)
AO Kyokuto Maru (Capt. Ota)
AO Shinkoku Maru (Capt. Tokugyo Ito)
AO  (Capt. Kazutaka Niimi)
AO Nippon Maru (Capt. Hironosuke Ueda)
AO Kokuyo Maru (Capt. Toraji Hidai)

Second Fleet (Midway Invasion Force)
Second Fleet Main Body (Vice Adm. Nobutake Kondō in Atago)
3rd Battleship Division less 2nd Section (Rear Adm. Gunichi Mikawa):
 (Capt. Tomiji Koyanagi)
 (Capt. Masao Nishida)
4th Cruiser Division less 2nd Section (Vice Adm. Kondo):
CA  (Capt. Baron Matsuji Ijuin)
CA  (Capt. Mikio Hayakawa)
5th Cruiser Division (Vice Adm. Takeo Takagi):
CA   (Capt. Teruhiko Miyoshi)
CA  (Capt. Tomokazu Mori)
Screening Force
4th Destroyer Squadron (Rear Adm. Shoji Nishimura in CL Yura):
CL  (Capt. Shiro Sato)
3rd Destroyer Division (Capt. Ranji Oe):
4 s:
 (Lt. Cmdr. Naoji Suenaga)
 (Cmdr. Takisaburo Matsubara)
 (Lt. Cmdr. Masao Kamiyama)
 (Cmdr. Kiyoshi Kamiyama)
9th Destroyer Division (Capt. Yasuo Sato):
3 s:
 (Cmdr. Toru Iwahashi)
 (Lt. Cmdr. Yasuatsu Suzuki)
 (Lt. Cmdr. Moritaro Tsukamoto)
Carrier Group (Capt. Sueo Obayashi):
CVL  (Capt. Obayashi)
12 Mitsubishi A6M2 Type 21 'Zeke' fighters (Lt. Saneyasu Hidaka)
12 Nakajima B5N2 'Kate' torpedo bombers (Lt. Kaji Matsuo)
  (Lt. Cmdr. Saneho Maeda)
Supply Group: (Capt. Jiro Murao in Sata):
AO Sata (Capt. Murao)
AO Tsurumi (Capt. Toshizo Fujita)
AO Genyo Maru (Capt. Shigetaro Ogawa)
AO Kenyo Maru (Capt. Yoshio Kanemasu)
AR Akashi (Capt. Tsunekichi Fukuzawa)
Midway Occupation Force (Rear Adm. Raizo Tanaka)
Transport Group carrying about 5000 troops under Capt. Minoru Ōta IJN and Colonel Kiyonao Ichiki IJA
Transports: Kiyosumi Maru (Capt. Seiichiro Kito)Keiyo Maru (Capt. Masamichi Ikeuchi)Zenyo MaruGoshu Maru (Capt. Hiyoshi Furuya)Toa Maru No. 2 GoKano Maru (Capt. Tomosaburo Miura)Argentina Maru (Cmdr. Takeshi Watanabe)Hokuroku Maru (Capt. Hiotaro Tsukagoshi)Brazil Maru (Capt. Kyujiro Jintsu)Kirishima Maru (Capt. Hiroshi Okubo)Azuma Maru (Capt. Nobuyoshi Morikawa)Nankai Maru (Capt. Akira Maki)
Patrol Boats: Patrol Boat #1Patrol Boat #2Patrol Boat #34 also carrying SNLF detachment
AO Akebono Maru (damaged by torpedo night of June 3–4) (Capt. Miki Otsuka)
Escort Force (Rear Adm. Tanaka in CL Jintsu):
CL  (Capt. Torazo Kozai)
15th Destroyer Division (Capt. Torajiro Sato):
2 s:
 (Cmdr. Tamaki Ugaki)
 (Cmdr. Tokiyoshi Arima)
16th Destroyer Division (Capt. Shiro Shibuya):
4 s:
 (Cmdr. Kenjiro Tobita)
 (Cmdr. Tameichi Hara)
 (Cmdr. Giichiro Nakahara)
 (Cmdr. Kameshiro Takahashi)
18th Destroyer Division (Capt. Yoshito Miyasaka):
2 s:
 (Cmdr. Shizuo Akazawa)
 (Cmdr. Minoru Yokoi)
2 s:
 (Cmdr. Kiyoshi Tomura)
 (Cmdr. Tomoe Ogata)
Seaplane Tender Group (Rear Adm. Ruitaro Fujita in Chitose)
11th Seaplane Tender Division
CVS  (Capt. Tamotsu Furukawa)
16 Nakajima A6M2-N 'Rufe' floatplane fighters
4 Aichi E13A 'Jake' scout floatplanes
AV  (Capt. Tarohachi Shinoda)
8 Nakajima A6M2-N 'Rufe' floatplane fighters
4 Aichi E13A 'Jake' scout floatplanes
  (Cmdr. Kiyoshi Kaneda)Patrol Boat #35 (carrying troops)
Midway Support Force (Vice Adm. Takeo Kurita in Kumano)
7th Cruiser Division (Vice Adm. Kurita):
CA  (Capt. Kikumatsu Tanaka)
CA  (Capt. Masatomi Kimura)
CA  (sunk) (Capt. Shakao Sakiyama†)
CA  (Capt. Akira Soji)
8th Destroyer Division (Cmdr. Nobuki Ogawa):
2 s:
 (Lt. Cmdr. Goro Yoshii)
 (Cmdr. Hideo Kuboki)
Attached Oiler:
AO Nichiei Maru (Capt. Matsushi Yamamoto)
Minesweeper Group (Capt. Sadatomo Miyamoto)
4 Auxiliary Minesweepers:Tama Maru #3 (Lt. (j.g.) Atsutoshi Yamaguchi)Tama Maru #5 (Lt. Akira Takato)Showa Maru #7 (Lt. Teruhisa Takahashi)Showa Maru #8 (Lt. (j.g.) Kiichi Sasaki)
3 Subchasers:Subchaser #16 (Lt. Yasukichi Suzuki)Subchaser #17 (Lt. Shigematsu Yoshioka)Subchaser #18 (Lt. Mitsugu Miyoi)
1 Supply ship:Soya (Cmdr. Toshi Kubota)
2 Cargo ships:Meiyo Maru (Capt. Hisao Koizumi)Yamafuku Maru (Capt. Torao Honda)
CL Katori (Capt. Noboru Owada)
3rd Submarine Squadron (Rear Adm. Chimaki Kona in Rio de Janeiro Maru at Kwajalein):
19th Submarine Division (Capt. Ryojiro Ono):
 (Lt. Cmdr. Katsuo Ohashi)
 (Lt. Cmdr. Sakae Nakajima)
 (Lt. Cmdr. Soshichi Kitamura)
 (Lt. Cmdr. Tamori Yoshimatsu)
13th Submarine Division (Capt. Takeji Miyazaki):
 (Lt. Cmdr. Yasuo Fujimori)
 (Lt. Cmdr. Sadatoshi Norita)
 (Lt. Cmdr. Toshitake Ueno)
30th Submarine Division (Capt. Maseo Teraoka):
 (Lt. Cmdr. Takakazu Kinashi)
 (Lt. Cmdr. Hakue Jarada)
 (Lt. Cmdr. Makio Tanaka)

Shore-based Air Force
Eleventh Air Fleet (Vice Admiral Nishizo Tsukahara at Tinian)
Midway Expeditionary Force (Capt. Chisato Morita):
36 Mitsubishi A6M Zero fighters (Lt. Tadashi Kaneko)
10 Mitsubishi G4M 'Betty' level bombers at Wake Island
 6 flying boats at Jaluit
24th Air Flotilla (Rear Adm. Minoru Maeda)
Chitose Air Group at Kwajalein (Capt. Fujiro Ohashi):
36 Mitsubishi A6M Zero fighters
36 Nakajima B5N2 'Kate' torpedo bombers
1st Air Group at Aur and Wotje (Capt. Samaji Inoue):
36 Mitsubishi A6M Zero fighters
36 Nakajima B5N2 'Kate' torpedo bombers
14th Air Group (Capt. Daizo Nakajima):
36 Kawanishi H6K 'Mavis' flying boats at Jaluit and Wotje

Northern Area Force
Fifth Fleet Main Body (Vice Adm. Boshirō Hosogaya in Nachi):
 heavy cruiser  (Capt. Takahiko Kiyota)
2 s:
 (Lt. Cmdr. Hajime Takeuchi)
 (Lt. Cmdr. Shunsaku Kudo)
Supply Group:
AO Fujisan Maru (Capt. Kikuta Maki)
AO Nissan Maru (Capt. Hachiro Naotsuka)
AC Muroto (Capt. Masaji Yamagata)
AP Akashisan Maru (Capt. Yoshio Hosoya)
AF Tōkō Maru No. 2 GoSecond Carrier Striking Force (Rear Adm. Kakuji Kakuta in Ryujo)
4th Carrier Division (Rear Adm. Kakuta):
CVL  (Capt. Tadeo Kato)
Air Unit (Lt. Masayuki Yamagami):
16 Mitsubishi A6M2 Type 21 'Zeke' fighters (Lt. Minoru Kobayashi)
21 Nakajima B5N2 'Kate' torpedo bombers (Lt. Yamagami)
CV  (Capt. Shizue Isii)
Air Unit (Lt. Yoshio Shiga):
24 Mitsubishi A6M Zero Type 21 'Zeke' fighters (Lt. Shiga)
15 Aichi D3A1 'Val' dive bombers (Lt. Zenji Abe)
4th Cruiser Division, 2nd Section (Capt. Shunsaku Nabeshima in Maya):
2  heavy cruisers:
 (Capt. Bunji Asakura)
 (Capt. Nabeshima)
7th Destroyer Division (Capt. Kaname Konishi): 
3 s:
 (Lt. Cmdr. Minoru Nakagawa)
 (Lt. Cmdr. Yoshitake Uesugi)
 (Lt. Cmdr. Hiroshi Uwai)
AO Teiyo Maru (Capt. Katasuke Tanaka)
Aleutian Support Force (Vice Adm. Shiro Takasu in Hyūga)
2nd Battleship Division (Vice Adm. Takasu):
 (Capt. Chozaemon Obata)
 (Capt. Chiaki Matsuda)
 (Capt. Isamu Takeda)
 (Capt. Gunji Kogure)
Screening Force (Rear Adm. Fukuji Kishi in Kitakami)
9th Cruiser Division (Rear Adm. Kishi):
CL  (Capt. Saiji Norimitsu)
CL  (Capt. Moichi Narita)
20th Destroyer Division (Capt. Yuji Yamada): 
4 s:
 (Lt. Cmdr. Nisaburo Maekawa)
 (Cmdr. Masayoshi Motokura)
 (Cmdr. Toyoji Hitomi)
 (Capt. Buichi Ashida)
24th Destroyer Division (Capt. Yasuji Hirai):
4 s:
 (Cmdr. Nagahide Sugitani)
 (Lt. Cmdr. Shuichi Hamanaka)
 (Lt. Cmdr. Kazuo Wakabayashi)
 (Lt. Cmdr. Kazuo Shibayama)
27th Destroyer Division (Capt. Matake Yoshimura):
2 s:
 (Lt. Cmdr. Shoichi Yoshida)
 (Lt. Cmdr. Kiyoshi Kamo)
2 s:
 (Cmdr. Noboru Seo)
 (Lt. Cmdr. Kanematsu Hashimoto)
Supply Group (Capt. Matsuo Eguchi):
AO San Clemente Maru (Capt. Eguchi)
AO Toa Maru (Capt. Yataro Yokohama)
Attu Invasion Force (Rear Adm. Sentaro Omori in Abukuma):
CL  (Capt. Seiroku Murayama)
21st Destroyer Division (Capt. Toshio Shimizu): 
4 s:
 (Lt. Cmdr. Masakichi Kuroki)
 (Lt. Cmdr. Saburo Terauchi)
 (Lt. Cmdr. Hiroshi Makino)
 (Lt. Cmdr. Satoru Kohama)Magane Maru Minelayer (Capt. Heiji Sasaki)
AP Kinugasa Maru (Capt. Naoshi Arima carrying 1200 army troops under Major Matsutoshi Hozumi)
Kiska Invasion Force (Capt. Takeji Ono in Kiso):
21st Cruiser Division (Capt. Ono)
CL  (Capt. Ono)
CL  (Capt. Masaharu Kawabata)Asaka Maru (Auxiliary Cruiser) (Capt. Jiro Ban)Awata Maru (Auxiliary Cruiser) (Capt. Kikuta Maki)
Screening Force
6th Destroyer Division (Capt. Yusuke Tamada):
2 s:
 (Lt. Cmdr. Hagumu Ishii)
 (Lt. Cmdr. Osamu Takasuka)
  (Lt. Cmdr. Tomo Tanaka)
13th Minesweeper Division (Capt. Toshio Mitsuka):Hakuhō MaruKaihō MaruShunkotsu MaruTransports:Hakusan Maru (Capt. Hareyoshi Goto) carrying 550 troops under Lt. Cmdr. Hifumi MukaiKumagawa Maru (Capt. Shiro Yoshida) carrying 700 labor troops with construction equipment
Submarine Detachment
1st Submarine Squadron (Rear Adm. Shigeaki Yamakazi):
 (Cmdr. Akiyoshi Fujii)
2nd Submarine Division (Capt. Hiroshi Imazato):
 (Cmdr. Nobuo Ishikawa)
 (Cmdr. Kozo Nishino)
 (Cmdr. Shogo Narahara)
4th Submarine Division (Capt. Mitsuru Nagai):
 (Cmdr. Akiji Tagami)
 (Cmdr. Minoru Yokota)
Aleutian Seaplane Tender Force (Capt. Keiichi Ujuku):
AV Kimikawa Maru (Capt. Ujuku)
Air Unit: 8 3-seat floatplanes
  (Lt. Yoji Tanegashima)

United States
The US Pacific Fleet and Pacific Ocean Areas were under the overall command of Admiral Chester Nimitz.

Carrier Strike Force
Task Force 17 (Rear Adm. Frank J. Fletcher in Yorktown)
 Task Group 17.5 (Carrier Group):
  (sunk) (Captain Elliott Buckmaster)Yorktown Air Group (Including elements from the sidelined  Air Group) (Lieutenant Commander Oscar Pederson): 
 25 Grumman F4F-4 Wildcat fighters (VF-3 – Lt. Cmdr. John S. Thach)
 18 Douglas SBD-3 Dauntless dive bombers (VB-3 – Lt. Cmdr. Maxwell F. Leslie)
 19 Douglas SBD-3 Dauntless dive bombers (VS-5 – Lt. Wallace C. Short, Jr.)
 13 Douglas TBD-1 Devastator torpedo bombers (VT-3 – Lt. Cmdr. Lance E. Massey†)
 Task Group 17.2 (Cruiser Group) (Rear Adm. William W. Smith in Astoria)
  (Capt. Francis W. Scanland)
  (Capt. Laurance T. DuBose)
 Task Group 17.4 (Destroyer Screen) (Capt. Gilbert Hoover, COMDESRON 2)
  (sunk) (Commander Arnold E. True)
  (Lt. Cmdr. William M. Hobby, Jr.)
  (Lt. Cmdr. John M. Higgins)
  (Lt. Cmdr. Donald J. Ramsey)
  (Cmdr. Harry B. Jarrett)
  (Lt. Cmdr. J. C. Pollock)

Task Force 16 (Rear Adm. Raymond A. Spruance in Enterprise)
 Task Group 16.5 (Carrier Group): 
  (Capt. George D. Murray)
 Enterprise Air Group (Lt. Cmdr. C. Wade McClusky): 
 27 F4F-4 fighters (VF-6 – Lt. James S. Gray)
 19 SBD-2/3 dive bombers (VB-6 – Lt. Richard H. Best)
 19 SBD-2/3 dive bombers (VS-6 – Lt. Wilmer E. Gallaher)
 14 TBD-1 torpedo bombers (VT-6 – Lt. Cmdr. Eugene E. Lindsey†)
  (Capt. Marc A. Mitscher, promoted to Rear Adm en route)
 Hornet Air Group (Cmdr. Stanhope C. Ring):
 27 F4F-4 fighters (VF-8 – Lt. Cmdr. Samuel G. Mitchell)
 19 SBD-2/3 dive bombers (VB-8 – Lt. Cmdr. Robert R. Johnson)
 18 SBD-1/2/3 dive bombers (VS-8 – Lt. Cmdr. Walter F. Rodee)
 15 TBD-1 torpedo bombers (VT-8 – Lt. Cmdr. John C. Waldron†)
 Task Group 16.2 (Cruiser Group) (Rear Adm. Thomas C. Kinkaid, COMCRUDIV 6)
 CA  (Capt. Frank L. Lowe)
 CA  (Capt. William D. Chandler Jr.)
 CA  (Capt. Howard H. Good)
 CA  (Capt. Frank J. Lowry)
 CA  (Capt. Frederick L. Riefkohl)
 CL  (Capt. Samuel P. Jenkins)
 Task Group 16.4 (Destroyer Screen) (Capt. Alexander R. Early, COMDESRON 1)
 Destroyer Squadron 1:
  (Lt. Cmdr. Edward L. Beck)
  (Lt. Cmdr. William G. Pogue)
  (Lt. Cmdr. William P. Burford)
  (Lt. Cmdr. George R. Phelan)
 Destroyer Squadron 6:
  (Lt. Cmdr. Harold H. Thiemroth)
  (Lt. Cmdr. Henry C. Daniel)
  (Lt. Cmdr. Joseph M. Worthington)
  (Lt. Cmdr. Francis H. Gardner)
  (Lt. Cmdr. Gelzer L. Sims)
 Oilers Group:
 AO  (Cmdr. Russell H. Ihrig)
 AO  (Capt. Ralph H. Henkle)
 DD  (Lt. Cmdr. C.F. Chillingworth, Jr.)
 DD  (Cmdr. Roland N. Smoot)

Submarines
Operational command under Rear Admiral Robert H. English (Commander, Submarine Force, Pacific Fleet) at Pearl Harbor.
 Task Group 7.1 (Midway Patrol Group)
  (Lt. Cmdr. G.A. Lewis)
  (Lt. Cmdr. Glynn R. Donaho)
  (Lt. Cmdr. J.W. Murphy)
  (Lt. Cmdr. F.W. Fenno)
  (Lt. Cmdr. E. Olsen)
  (Lt. Cmdr. William H. Brockman Jr.)
  (Lt. Cmdr. C.E. Duke)
  (Lt. Cmdr. R.L. Rutter)
  (Lt. Cmdr. W.G. Myers)
  (Lt. Cmdr. Martin P. Hottel)
  (Lt. Cmdr. H.B. Lyon)
  (Lt. Cmdr. Willis A. Lent)
 Task Group 7.2 ("Roving Short-Stops")
  (Lt. Cmdr. C.W. Wilkins)
  (Lt. Cmdr. D.C. White)
  (Lt. Cmdr. J.H. Lewis)
 Task Group 7.3 (North of Oahu Patrol)
  (Lt. Cmdr. Lewis Wallace)
  (Lt. Cmdr. J.L. Hull)
  (Lt. Cmdr. W.A. New)
  (Lt. Cmdr. Howard W. Gilmore)

Midway Garrison
Air group
Marine Aircraft Group 22 - Colonel Ira L. Kimes, USMC
 21 Brewster F2A-3 (VMF-221, Major Floyd B. Parks†, USMC)
  7 Grumman F4F-3A Wildcat (VMF-221, Captain John F. Carey, USMC)
 19 Douglas SBD-2 Dauntless (VMSB-241 Major Lofton R. Henderson†, USMC)
 17 Chance-Vought SB2U-3 Vindicator (VMSB-241, Major Benjamin W. Norris†, USMC)
Navy Air Units - Captain Cyril T. Simard
 31 PBY-5 and PBY-5A Catalinas (Detachments from Patrol Wings 1 and 2, USN)
  6 Grumman TBF Avenger (Detachment from VT-8, USS Hornet - Lt. Langdon K. Fieberling†, USN)
Detachment of Seventh Air Force - Maj. Gen. Willis Hale
  4 Martin B-26 Marauder (Detachments from 18th Reconnaissance and 69th Bombardment Squadrons - Capt. James Collins, USAAF)
 17 Boeing B-17 Flying Fortress (Detachments from 26th, 31st, 72nd, 431st Bombardment Squadrons - Lt.Col. Walter C. Sweeney, Jr., USAAF)

Local Defenses - Colonel Harold D. Shannon, Fleet Marine Force commander
"C" and "D" Companies, 2nd Raider Battalion, USMC
6th Defense Battalion (Reinforced) USMC Colonel Harold D. Shannon
1st Motor Torpedo Boat Squadron
11 PT boats (9 at Midway Island and 2 at Kure Atoll)

Deployed along lesser reefs and islands of the Hawaiian Group
French Frigate Shoals
 seaplane tenders  and 
gasoline tanker 
destroyer 
Pearl and Hermes Reef
patrol boat 
fleet tug 

Lisianski Island
patrol boat YP-284Gardner Pinnacles
patrol boat YP-345Laysan Island
patrol boat YP-290Necker Island
patrol boat YP-350''

Midway Refueling Unit
Comdr. Harry R. Thurber, USN
AO 
DD  and 

The military forces at the immediate point of tactical contact (i.e. not including support formations) are described below.

Aircraft

American Forces
Naval Air Station (NAS) Midway operated:

United States Navy
31 Consolidated PBY-5 Catalina, seaplanes.
6 Grumman TBF-1 Avenger, torpedo bombers (5 lost)

United States Army Air Forces
4 Martin B-26 Marauder, medium bombers
17 Boeing B-17 Flying Fortress, heavy bombers

United States Marine Corps
19 Douglas SBD-2 Dauntless, dive bombers
17 Chance-Vought SB2U-3 Vindicator, dive bombers
21 Brewster F2A Buffalo, fighters
7 Grumman F4F-3A Wildcat, fighters
1 light utility aircraft

Task Force 17:

: 77 aircraft (sunk)
25 Grumman F4F-4 Wildcat, fighters
37 Douglas SBD-3 Dauntless, dive bombers
15 Douglas TBD-1 Devastator, torpedo bombers (13 lost)

Task Force 16:

: 78 aircraft
27 Grumman F4F-4 Wildcat, fighters
37 Douglas SBD-3 Dauntless, dive bombers
14 Douglas TBD-1 Devastator, torpedo bombers (10 lost)

: 77 aircraft
27 Grumman F4F-4 Wildcat, fighters
35 Douglas SBD-3 Dauntless, dive bombers
15 Douglas TBD-1 Devastator, torpedo bombers (all lost)

Japanese Forces
The Japanese carriers of the Striking Force operated:

: 60 aircraft (sunk)
 24 Mitsubishi A6M Zero, fighters
 18 Aichi D3A,"Val" dive bombers
 18 Nakajima B5N,"Kate" torpedo bombers
: 74 aircraft (sunk)
 27 Mitsubishi A6M Zero, fighters
 18 Aichi D3A,"Val" dive bombers
 27 Nakajima B5N,"Kate" torpedo bombers
 2 Aichi D3A,"Val" dive bombers (as cargo, likely non-operational)
: 57 aircraft (sunk)
 21 Mitsubishi A6M Zero, fighters
 18 Aichi D3A,"Val" dive bombers
 18 Nakajima B5N,"Kate" torpedo bombers
: 57 aircraft (sunk)  
 21 Mitsubishi A6M Zero, fighters
 16 Aichi D3A,"Val" dive bombers
 18 Nakajima B5N,"Kate" torpedo bombers
 2 Yokosuka D4Y1C, pre-series dive bombers (experimental reconnaissance aircraft)

(Note: These figures include 21 operational Zero fighters of the 6th Air Group being ferried to Midway by the carriers.)
 Japanese battleships and cruisers: 16 reconnaissance floatplanes, most of them short-ranged (5 Aichi E13A, 10 Nakajima E8N, 1 Aichi E11A)

Footnotes

References

 
World War II orders of battle